The GE 80-ton switcher is a diesel-electric locomotive model built by GE Transportation Systems. It is classified as a B-B type locomotive. It was designed for industrial and light switching duties around railheads and ports.

Military version 

The military purchased 80-tonners between 1952 and 1953 for use switching railheads around Continental U.S. (CONUS) military facilities. In the 1990s Rail Equipment Division at Tooele Army Depot rebuilt most 80-tonners to have Cummins turbo-charged  6-cylinder engines. The rebuild included a small cosmetic change resulting in end radiator screens and dual headlights. This rebuild gave all Army and some Air Force 80-tonners a much longer lifespan. Less than 27 Army and 5 Air Force 80-tonners are still in service present day. Navy 80-tonners did not undergo this rebuild. Many Navy engines were rebuilt by contracts with locomotive rehab companies.

Heritage Railways
At least five 80-tonners have been known to be in tourist service. These locomotives resided on the Virginia & Truckee Railroad. The D-1 was acquired in 2003 and was the mainstay of the fleet while the railroad's two steam locomotives were undergoing rebuild. The Valley Railroad in Essex, Connecticut owns five 80-tonners, 0900, 0901, 0902, 0903, and 7145, for use on the Essex Clipper Dinner Train, as well as for yard switching and work train service. Former US Army 1654 is in regular service at the Rochester and Genesee Valley Railroad Museum as their No. 54, along with Eastman Kodak No. 6. An 80-ton G.E. switcher #7285, built in 1943, is still in operation at the Pacific Southwest Railway Museum in Campo, California in San Diego County on the San Diego & Arizona Railway. The Nevada Southern Railway  located in Boulder City, Nevada, has one of the GE 80 tonners that was used at the Nevada Atomic Test site north of Las Vegas in the 1950s on the Jackass and Western Railroad for the nuclear engine development and testing program. US Navy 65-00310 is privately owned and is used on a recreational railroad at the Denton FarmPark in Denton, North Carolina.

80-ton switcher
B-B locomotives
Diesel-electric locomotives of the United States
Standard gauge locomotives of the United States